The 3rd South American Under-23 Championships in Athletics were held
in Lima, Peru, at the Estadio de la Villa Deportiva Nacional (VIDENA) on September 5–7, 2008.

Participation
Between 220 and 260 athletes from 11 countries were reported to participate in the
event.  An unofficial count through the result lists resulted in 230 participating athletes:

 (16)
 (9)
 (74)
 (34)
 (18)
 (14)
 (5)
 (1)
 (40)
 (4)
 (15)

Medal summary

Detailed results can be found on the CBAt website, on the Fecodatle website, on the FEDACHI website and on the Tilastopaja website.

Men

Women

Medal table (unofficial)

Team trophies

The placing tables for team trophy (overall team, men and women categories) were published.

Total

Male

Female

References

South American Under-23 Championships in Athletics
2008 in Peruvian sport
South America U23
International athletics competitions hosted by Peru
2008 in youth sport